Washington County Transportation Authority, operating as Freedom Transit, is the official transportation authority in Washington County, Pennsylvania.  It was created in 2001 to take over the "human service transportation programs previously overseen by the County’s Department of Human Services and managed by a private broker."  Other than Philadelphia and Allegheny County, the Washington County Transportation Authority operates the fifth largest shared ride program in Pennsylvania.

In 2015, Washington City Transit merged into the Washington County Transportation Authority and also became an operator of fixed-route bus service. The agency operates in the central portion of the county, which includes the county seat of Washington and a growing suburban area. The industrial Monongahela Valley portion of the county continues to be served by the Mid Mon Valley Transit Authority For commuter service, Freedom Transit offers two suburban park-and-ride lots: along Interstate 79 in South Strabane Township, Pennsylvania and at the Southpointe development in Cecil Township.

Route List
County Line- Washington to Houston, Canonsburg, and McDonald (weekdays)
Local A- Washington Hospital/Jefferson Avenue (Monday-Saturday)
Local B- Shopping Centers (Monday-Saturday)
Metro Commuter- Washington, Houston, Canonsburg, and Southpointe to Downtown Pittsburgh (Monday-Saturday)

References

Transportation in Washington County, Pennsylvania
Bus transportation in Pennsylvania
Municipal authorities in Pennsylvania